Claiborne may refer to:

People

Surname
Billy Claiborne (1860–1882), western outlaw
Lindy Boggs (Corinne Claiborne Boggs, 1916–2013), member of the U.S. House of Representatives from Louisiana; U.S. Ambassador to the Vatican
Chris Claiborne (born 1978), former American football linebacker
Craig Claiborne (1920–2000), U.S. food writer and columnist for the New York Times
Ferdinand Claiborne (1773–1815), U.S. military officer most notable for his command during the Creek War and the War of 1812
Harry E. Claiborne (1917–2004), United States District Judge, Nevada, from 1978 until his impeachment and removal in 1986
James Robert Claiborne (1882–1944), member of the U.S. House of Representatives from Missouri
John Claiborne (1777–1808), member of the U.S. House of Representatives from Virginia
John Claiborne (baseball executive) (born 1940), executive in American Major League Baseball and a president of the New England Sports Network (NESN)
John Francis Hamtramck Claiborne (1809–1884), member of Mississippi state legislature
John Herbert Claiborne (1828–1905), surgeon and physicist
Liz Claiborne (1929–2007), pioneer fashion designer and entrepreneur
Nathaniel Claiborne (1777–1859), member of Virginia state legislature, member of the U.S. House of Representatives from Virginia
Robert Claiborne (1919–1990), American folk singer, labor organizer and writer of books on science, anthropology and linguistics
Shane Claiborne (born 1975), Christian writer, speaker, and activist
Theresa Claiborne (born 1959), first African-American female pilot in the United States Air Force 
Thomas Claiborne (1749–1812), member of Virginia state legislature; member of the U.S. House of Representatives from Virginia
Thomas Claiborne (1780–1856), lawyer; member of Tennessee state house of representatives; member of the U.S. House of Representatives from Tennessee
William Claiborne (c. 1600–1676), Virginia statesman
William C. C. Claiborne (died 1817), member of the U.S. House of Representatives from Tennessee and first Governor of Louisiana

Given name
C. P. Ellis (Claiborne P. Ellis, 1927–2005), Ku Klux Klan member turned civil rights activist
Claiborne P. Deming, American businessman.
Claiborne Fox Jackson (1806–1862), Governor of Missouri
Claiborne Pell (1918–2009), U.S. senator from Rhode Island

Places in the United States
Claiborne, Alabama
Claiborne, Louisiana
Claiborne, Maryland
Claiborne, Virginia
Claiborne County (disambiguation)
Claiborne Farm, thoroughbred race horse breeding farm in Paris, Kentucky
Claiborne Formation, a geologic formation in Arkansas, Illinois, and Kentucky, U.S.
Claiborne Parish, Louisiana
Lake Claiborne, a reservoir near Homer, Louisiana, U.S.

See also
 Cliburn (surname)
Dolores Claiborne, novel by Stephen King
Dolores Claiborne (film), based on the novel
Dolores Claiborne (opera), a 2013 opera by Tobias Picker, based on the novel